Fanny Hill (also known as Sex, Lies and Renaissance) is a 1983 British sex comedy film directed by Gerry O'Hara and starring Lisa Foster, Oliver Reed, Wilfrid Hyde-White and Shelley Winters. It is adapted from the 1748 novel of the same name by John Cleland.

Plot
Poor country lass Fanny Hill sets off for London where she embarks on a series of sexual encounters in pursuit of wealth and happiness, "with many erotic asides."

Cast
 Lisa Foster - Fanny Hill (as Lisa Raines)
 Oliver Reed - Edward Widdlecome
 Wilfrid Hyde-White - Mr. Barville
 Shelley Winters - Mrs Cole
 Alfred Marks - Lecher
 Paddie O'Neil - Mrs Brown
 Barry Stokes - Charles (as Jonathan York)
  Maria Harper - Phoebe
  Vicki Scott - Polly (uncredited)
  Lorraine Doyle - Martha (uncredited)
  Angie Quick - Sarah (uncredited)
 Susie Silvey - Jane (uncredited)
 Harry Fowler - Beggar (uncredited)
 Gordon Rollings - Beggar (uncredited)
 Liz Smith - Mrs. Jones (uncredited)
 Howard Goorney - Mr. Croft (uncredited)
 Janet Henfrey - Lady in Intelligence Office (uncredited)

Critical reception
Time Out wrote, "a relatively large budget and some respectable names in the cast list, but this is still limp softcore flummery sold on the half-remembered notoriety of its purported 18th century source...Lawyer Reed and madam Winters, meanwhile, seem as though they have their teeth gritted in the hope that it will all be over soon."
Sky Movies wrote, "they should have made the script funnier, got Kenneth Williams and Joan Sims - and retitled it Carry On Fanny..."

References

External links

1983 films
1980s sex comedy films
British sex comedy films
1980s English-language films
Films directed by Gerry O'Hara
Films set in the 18th century
Films based on British novels
1983 comedy films
1980s British films